Creamy were a Faroese-Danish teen-pop duo, composed of Rebekka Mathew and Rannva Joensen.

Their 1999 debut album, Creamy, made when the pair were just thirteen years of age, was composed of euro-pop versions of children’s songs. In 2001, they released a seasonal album, Christmas Snow. Their only single in the UK was a euro-pop cover of the theme song to the 1984 movie, Neverending Story, which was featured on their second album, We Got the Time. They were signed to RecArt Music Denmark.

Their album, "We Got the Time" was produced by Ole Evenrud, of A*Teens fame. Ole Evenrud also produced a version of a song from that album, "Help! I'm a Fish (I'm a Little Yellow Fish)", for the Danish pop group, Little Trees.

After their appearance on Dancemania Speed 10 with a speedy remix of their song "I Do I Do I Do" in late 2002, Creamy appeared on this eurodance compilation series, Dancemania, several times.

Discography

Studio albums

Singles

In popular media
"I Do, I Do, I Do" is a playable song in Dance Dance Revolution Extreme in Normal, Beginner and Nonstop modes. In Nonstop, it is the final of four songs in the Pop4 course.

References

External links 
 Official Creamy Website, http://www.creamy.dk at the Internet Archive (as of November 22, 2002)
 Creamy at Discogs
Creamy at Bubblegum Dancer

Danish musical duos
Danish girl groups
Danish pop music groups
Pop music duos
Female musical duos
Musical groups established in 1999
Musical groups disestablished in 2002
1999 establishments in Denmark